The Hamaxobii, Anglicized Hamaxobians or Amaxobians, were a nomadic tribe who lived in chariots with leather tents mounted on them. They were Scythians. They were said to be descendants of the Medes.

They lived near the Palus Maeotis. Claudius Ptolemy places them along the Vistula river.

Name
The word is compounded of Greek ἄμαξα ("chariot"), and βίος ("life").

References

Scythians
Nomadic groups in Eurasia
Chariots
Ancient peoples of Russia
Sarmatian tribes